The 1948 UK & Ireland Greyhound Racing Year was the 23rd year of greyhound racing in the United Kingdom and Ireland.

Roll of honour

Summary
The annual totalisator turnover was £99,449,342, which although the fourth highest ever recorded was also the second consecutive drop since 1946. The minimum betting stake on the track totalisator was increased from two to four shillings but quickly changed back following a widespread slump. The government ban on mid-week racing continued.

Western Post and Priceless Border claimed the big Derby races but Local Interprize was the star of the year, after he claimed four classic competitions. They were the Gold Collar, Scurry Gold Cup, Welsh Greyhound Derby and the Cesarewitch.

Competitions
A greyhound called Narrogar Ann from a litter of six, out of the bitch Winnie of Berrow (winner of the 1944 Eclipse) came to prominence when successful in the Western Two year Old Produce Stakes. Narrogar Ann trained by Joe Farrand at Oxford Stadium beat littermates Narrogar Dusty and Narrogar Tommy who finished second and third respectively. Narrogar Ann would soon move to Leslie Reynolds at Wembley.

Local Interprize won the Laurels and Welsh Derby, in the latter he recorded a seven length final win in a new track record time defeating a field that included the Scottish Greyhound Derby champion Western Post, an 84lb fawn and white dog. Local Interprize then won the Scurry final by eight lengths before losing out to Good Worker trained by former Surrey cricketer Jack Daley, in the Laurels. Local Interprize finished the year by claiming a remarkable fourth classic when picking up the Cesarewitch trophy on 23 October.

Tracks
Rayleigh Weir Stadium in Southend-on-Sea was one of seven known track to open, three of them were in Ireland. Breck Park Stadium in Liverpool, closed following a devastating fire and fire also destroyed most of the stands at Long Eaton Stadium. The total number of tracks in the United Kingdom with a betting licence was 209, of which 77 were affiliated to the National Greyhound Racing Society and raced under National Greyhound Racing Club rules.

Tracks opened

News
On 1 April, Fred Trevillion,  Arthur Hancock (head kennel-man) and Trev's Perfection left on the Queen Mary for Raynham Park, Raynham, Massachusetts in the United States, where the dog was expected to make headlines. The venture was a failure and in five races he did not win one and returned to England in July. Sir William Gentle died.

Ireland
The Irish Greyhound Derby offered a record £1,000 first prize and attracted the Frank Davis trained Western Post; Davis put him with Paddy Moclair for the duration of the event. Moclair had originally bought the dog at the Limerick sales for £240 before selling him to Davis for £2,000. The fawn and white dog became the first winner of the Scottish and Irish Derby.

The Greyhound Racing Association set up the Kingsfurze breeding establishment at Naas in County Kildare, the seven acre grounds included a house, cottage and 15 runs. The greyhounds would transfer to training establishments within the GRA as soon as they were older enough.

Principal UK races

+Track Record

Totalisator Returns

The totalisator returns declared to the licensing authorities for the year 1948 are listed below. Tracks that did not have a totalisator in operation are not listed.

+ closed during the year due to fire

Summary

+ number of tracks include those without a tote in operation

References 

Greyhound racing in the United Kingdom
Greyhound racing in the Republic of Ireland
UK and Ireland Greyhound Racing Year
UK and Ireland Greyhound Racing Year
UK and Ireland Greyhound Racing Year
UK and Ireland Greyhound Racing Year